The Mayur River is located in Bangladesh. It is a former distributary of the Ganges close to the northwestern boundary of the metropolitan area of Khulna, and receives most of the drainage from the city. The river is obstructed by sediment buildup, and its natural tidal flow is prevented by gates.

References

Rivers of Bangladesh
Khulna
Rivers of Khulna Division